Dekeyseria picta is a species of armored catfish endemic to Brazil, and found in the lower Rio Negro basin, the largest left tributary of the Amazon River.  This species grows to a length of  TL.

References 
 

Ancistrini
Catfish of South America
Freshwater fish of Brazil
Endemic fauna of Brazil
Fish described in 1854